Rhabdosargus is a genus of fish in the family Sparidae.

Species
There are currently 6 recognized species in this genus:
 Rhabdosargus globiceps Valenciennes, 1830 (White stumpnose)
 Rhabdosargus haffara Forsskål, 1775 (Haffara seabream)
 Rhabdosargus holubi Steindachner, 1881 (Cape stumpnose)
 Rhabdosargus niger F. Tanaka & Iwatsuki, 2013 (Blackish stumpnose) 
 Rhabdosargus sarba Forsskål, 1775 (Goldlined seabream)
 Rhabdosargus thorpei M. M. Smith, 1979 (Bigeye stumpnose)

References

 
Marine fish genera
Taxa named by Henry Weed Fowler